Grosse Pointe Woods is a city in Wayne County in the U.S. state of Michigan.  The population was 16,135 at the 2010 census.  

The city is a northeastern suburb of Metro Detroit and shares a small southern border with the city of Detroit.  It is part of the Grosse Pointe collection of cities and the only one without a waterfront on Lake St. Clair.

History
While initially settled over a century ago, much of the city in its current form was built in the middle of the 20th century, particularly around and just after World War II, distinguishing Grosse Pointe Woods from older portions of Grosse Pointe.

The city was originally incorporated as the Village of Lochmoor in 1927 from the last unincorporated portion of Grosse Pointe Township.  The village annexed the Stanhope-Allard strip of land from what was then Gratiot Township in 1931.  The village changed its name from Lochmoor to Grosse Pointe Woods in 1939, but didn't incorporate as a city until 1950.

Geography
It is the only one of the five Grosse Pointes with no Lake St. Clair shoreline, although the city owns a park in neighboring St. Clair Shores that is on the lake.

Demographics

2010 census
As of the census of 2010, there were 16,135 people, 6,416 households, and 4,681 families living in the city. The racial makeup of the city was 91.4% White, 4.5% African American, 0.1% Native American, 2.4% Asian, 0.3% from other races, and 1.3% from two or more races. Hispanic or Latino of any race were 1.7% of the population.

There were 6,416 households, of which 31.9% had children under the age of 18 living with them, 60.0% were married couples living together, 10.0% had a female householder with no husband present, 3.0% had a male householder with no wife present, and 27.0% were non-families. 24.4% of all households were made up of individuals, and 12.7% had someone living alone who was 65 years of age or older. The average household size was 2.51 and the average family size was 3.01.

The median age in the city was 45.1 years. 23.7% of residents were under the age of 18; 6.2% were between the ages of 18 and 24; 20% were from 25 to 44; 32.4% were from 45 to 64; and 17.7% were 65 years of age or older. The gender makeup of the city was 47.9% male and 52.1% female.

2000 census
As of the census of 2000, there were 17,080 people, 6,531 households, and 4,970 families living in the city. The racial makeup of the city was 96.30% White, 0.63% African American, 0.06% Native American, 2.08% Asian, 0.11% from other races, and 0.81% from two or more races. Hispanic or Latino of any race were 0.98% of the population.

There were 6,531 households, out of which 35.1% had children under the age of 18 living with them, 65.4% were married couples living together, 8.5% had a female householder with no husband present, and 23.9% were non-families. 22.0% of all households were made up of individuals, and 10.8% had someone living alone who was 65 years of age or older.  The average household size was 2.60 and the average family size was 3.07.

In the city, the population was spread out, with 26.1% under the age of 18, 5.0% from 18 to 24, 25.2% from 25 to 44, 25.6% from 45 to 64, and 18.2% who were 65 years of age or older.  The median age was 42 years. For every 100 females, there were 92.7 males.  For every 100 females age 18 and over, there were 87.7 males.

The median income for a household in the city was $78,558, and the median income for a family was $89,086. Males had a median income of $70,488 versus $43,665 for females. The per capita income for the city was $38,653.  About 1.7% of families and 2.4% of the population were below the poverty line, including 2.3% of those under age 18 and 2.8% of those age 65 or over.

Our Lady Star of the Sea school originally opened in 1957, in a narthex of the church, educating first graders only, while a new adjacent K-8 school building was being built.

Primary and secondary schools
Grosse Pointe Woods is served by the Grosse Pointe Public Schools. Three public elementary schools are in the city limits and serve the city limits: Ferry, Mason, and Monteith. Most residents are zoned to Parcells Middle School in Grosse Pointe Woods, while some areas to the southwest are zoned to Brownell Middle School in Grosse Pointe Farms. All residents are zoned to Grosse Pointe North High School in Grosse Pointe Woods.

University Liggett School is in Grosse Pointe Woods.

Our Lady Star of the Sea School, a private Catholic K-8 school, is in the community. It first opened in 1958. Our Lady Star of the Sea High School, a girls' school, opened in 1959. When the high closed in 1993, the middle school began using the building.

Public libraries
The Grosse Pointe Public Library operates the Woods Branch in Grosse Pointe Woods.

Notable people
 J. K. Simmons, actor
 Corey Tropp, NHL ice hockey player

References

External links 

 
 Grosse Pointe Historical Society
 Parcells Middle School
 Public elementary schools: Ferry, Mason, and Monteith
 Our Lady Star of the Sea School

Cities in Wayne County, Michigan
Metro Detroit
Populated places established in 1927
1927 establishments in Michigan